Marc Höcher (born 9 September 1984 in Almelo) is a Dutch football player who currently plays for VV UNA in the Dutch Derde Divisie.

Career
He made his debut in professional football, being part of the Heracles Almelo squad in the 2002–03 season. Since the season 2007–08 he plays for Helmond Sport. In the summer of 2008 he joined Helmond Sport definitely. On 14 March 2011 it became clear that Höcher signed a contract with ADO Den Haag, which later was confirmed by the club. After only playing seven matches in the first half of the 2011–12 season, Höcher was sent on loan to Willem II for the remainder of the season. After the season, he signed a one-year contract with the same team. After the relegation of Willem II, Höcher left the team on a free transfer. On 7 June, he signed three-year contract with Eredivisie side Roda JC Kerkrade.

References

External links
 Voetbal International profile 

1984 births
Living people
Dutch footballers
Heracles Almelo players
Helmond Sport players
ADO Den Haag players
Willem II (football club) players
Roda JC Kerkrade players
FC Rot-Weiß Erfurt players
Eredivisie players
Eerste Divisie players
Derde Divisie players
3. Liga players
Sportspeople from Almelo
VV UNA players
Association football wingers
Footballers from Overijssel
Dutch expatriate footballers
Expatriate footballers in Germany
Dutch expatriate sportspeople in Germany
20th-century Dutch people
21st-century Dutch people